Leroy is a city in McLennan County, Texas, United States. The population was 310 at the 2010 census. It is part of the Waco Metropolitan Statistical Area.

Geography

Leroy is located at  (31.731794, –97.020240).

Demographics

As of the census of 2000, there were 335 people, 121 households, and 86 families residing in the city. The population density was 175.7 people per square mile (67.7/km). There were 134 housing units at an average density of 70.3/sq mi (27.1/km). The racial makeup of the city was 93.13% White, 4.48% African American, 1.79% from other races, and 0.60% from two or more races. Hispanic or Latino of any race were 2.09% of the population.

There were 121 households, out of which 28.9% had children under the age of 18 living with them, 62.8% were married couples living together, 7.4% had a female householder with no husband present, and 28.9% were non-families. 24.8% of all households were made up of individuals, and 12.4% had someone living alone who was 65 years of age or older. The average household size was 2.72 and the average family size was 3.20.

In the city, the population was spread out, with 23.9% under the age of 18, 9.9% from 18 to 24, 28.7% from 25 to 44, 20.9% from 45 to 64, and 16.7% who were 65 years of age or older. The median age was 39 years. For every 100 females, there were 105.5 males. For every 100 females age 18 and over, there were 109.0 males.

The median income for a household in the city was $40,500, and the median income for a family was $45,875. Males had a median income of $30,625 versus $21,058 for females. The per capita income for the city was $16,970. About 6.9% of families and 6.3% of the population were below the poverty line, including none of those under age 18 and 28.1% of those age 65 or over.

Education
The City of Leroy is served by the West Independent School District.

References

Cities in McLennan County, Texas
Cities in Texas